
Year 683 (DCLXXXIII) was a common year starting on Thursday (link will display the full calendar) of the Julian calendar. The denomination 683 for this year has been used since the early medieval period, when the Anno Domini calendar era became the prevalent method in Europe for naming years.

Events 
 By place 

 Britain 
 King Sighere of Essex dies after a 19-year joint reign. His brother Sæbbi becomes the sole ruler of Essex until his death in 694.

 Arabian Empire 
 Siege of Mecca:  The Umayyad army led by Husayn ibn Numayr al-Sakuni besieges Mecca, during which the Kaaba ("Sacred House") catches fire and is burned down.
 Uqba ibn Nafi, Arab general, is ambushed and killed near Biskra (modern Algeria). His Muslim army evacuates the city of Kairouan in Tunisia, and withdraws to Barca.  
 November 14 – Caliph Yazid I dies at Damascus, after a 3-year reign marked by civil war. He is succeeded by his son Muawiya II as ruler of the Umayyad Caliphate.

 Asia 
 December 27 – Emperor Gao Zong dies at Luoyang, age 55, after a 34-year reign in which he expanded the Chinese Empire by acquiring Korea as a vassal state.
 Emperor Tenmu decrees  a reform in Japan; copper coins must be used instead of silver coins. Three days later he issues a decree to allow the continued use of silver.
 Prince Ōtsu, son of Tenmu, attends to matters of State for the first time (approximate date).
  Sri Vijaya is founded by Sri Jayanasa in Sumatra 

 Mesoamerica 
 Pacal the Great, ruler (ajaw) of the Maya state of Palenque (Mexico), dies after a 68-year reign. He is buried in the Temple of the Inscriptions. He was the longest-reigning monarch in the world until Louis XIV broke that record in 1711, almost 1028 years later and remained the longest-reigning monarch in the Americas until Elizabeth II broke that record in 2020, almost 1337 years later

 By topic 

 Religion 
 Seaxwulf, bishop of Mercia, founds  All Saints' Church at Brixworth (approximate date). 
 June 28 – Pope Leo II dies at Rome 10 months after being consecrated.

Art
 The sarcophagus lid in the tomb of K'inich Janaab' Pakal (Shield 2), Temple of the Inscriptions, Palenque, Mexico, Maya culture is made. (approximate date)

Births 
 Bilge Khan, ruler (khagan) of the Turkic Khaganate (or 684)
 Genshō, empress of Japan (d. 748)
 Monmu, emperor of Japan (d. 707)
 Yi Xing, Chinese astronomer and mechanical engineer (d. 727)

Deaths 
 June 28 – Leo II, pope of the Catholic Church (b. 611) 
 November 11 – Yazid I, Muslim caliph (b. 647)
 December 27 – Gao Zong, emperor of the Tang Dynasty (b. 628)
 Æbbe, Anglo-Saxon princess and abbess
 Anseung, king of Goguryeo (Korea)
 Cui Zhiwen, official of the Tang Dynasty (b. 627)
 Dúnchad Muirisci, king of Connacht (Ireland)
 Pacal the Great, ruler (ajaw) of Palenque (b. 603) 
 Sighere, king of Essex
 Uqba ibn Nafi, Arab general (b. 622)
 Waningus, Frankish abbot (approximate date)  
 Xue Rengui, general of the Tang Dynasty (b. 614)
 Xue Yuanchao, official of the Tang Dynasty (b. 622)

References 

 

da:680'erne#683